The GEFA Bank GmbH is a company for manufacturer independent sales and investment funding for mobile economic goods. The company, which was founded in 1949 as subsidiary of the Deutsche Bank, employs in its Wuppertal branch at the Robert-Daum-Platz as well as in nationwide seven branches with around 500 members of staff. Since 2001 the GEFA belongs to the internationally significant major bank Société Générale and sells its products under the umbrella brand Société Générale Equipment Finance. The Societe Generale Equipment Finance is represented in 19 European countries as well as Brazil, China and the USA with more than 100 branches. On May 23, 2016 the GEFA Gesellschaft für Absatzfinanzierung mbH and the GEFA-Leasing GmbH merged and became the GEFA Bank GmbH.

Products and services 
In the area of investment funding the GEFA offers mostly middle-class clients the following products:
 Investment credits
 Finance lease
 Operating lease
 Rent-to-own
 Truck-Trailer-Rent (via subsidiary PEMA GmbH)
 VAT-funding
 Full-Service-Vehicle-Lease
 Insurances
 Loyalty card

In addition the GEFA supports manufacturers and salesmen with the following funding solutions which are being internationally accompanied by the SG-Equipment-Finance-Network:
 Sales credits
 Sales and distribution lease 
 Purchase funding 
 Rent-park funding 
 Rent
 Refinancing
 Insurances 
In 2012 the GEFA picked up the deposit business with private customers and in 2014 with trade customers.

Funded objects
The GEFA is financing objects especially from the areas transport (e.g. trucks, omnibuses, business jets, riverboats, agricultural machinery), industrial goods (e.g. construction machinery, printing machines, tool machines) and high tech (e.g. hard- and software, office equipment, biomedical engineering). In 2015 the GEFA generated a new business volume of 1.899 million Euro. 1.203 million Euros were generated in the transport sector, 435 million in the industrial goods sector and 261 million in the high tech sector.

Deposit guarantee
The GEFA is subject to the legal deposit guarantee and is a member of the deposit protection fund of the Bundesverband deutscher Banken e.V.

Technology
The brand GEFA Bank is affiliated to the cooperative data center of Fiducia IT AG in Karlsruhe and uses their banking software agree for its IT. In addition an extensive and longstanding partnership exists with the Paderborn company S&N.

References

External links

 

Banks of Germany
Banks established in 1949